Kulotunga Cinkaiariyan was the third of the Aryacakravarti kings of Jaffna Kingdom. Author of the book “Ancient Jaffna” C. Rasanayagam calculated that he has been ruled Jaffna from 1256 to 1279 (23 years). Yalpana Vaipava Malai says he followed his ancestor and promoted agriculture, and he converted waste land into agriculture land. Also the book added that during his rule the kingdom was peaceful and prosper.

Notes

References
 Yalpana Vaipava Malai

Kings of Jaffna
Sri Lankan Tamil royalty
13th-century monarchs in Asia